Joseph Comstock (16xx–17xx) was a member of the House of Representatives of the Colony of Connecticut from Norwalk in the session of October 1738. He succeeded Samuel Hanford and Thomas Benedict as Representative and served alongside Joseph Platt. His term ended in May 1739, where he was succeeded by Joseph Platt and John Betts, Jr. 

Little is known about Comstock's life other than his political service to Norwalk. He resided in Norwalk during his term as Representative and most likely practiced law or farming while there. As a Representative, he advocated for better infrastructure such as roads and bridges which would benefit Norwalk economically and socially. Additionally, he was actively involved in local politics and held positions such as Town Clerk and Justice of the Peace. 

Comstock's legacy still lives on today in Norwalk through various landmarks dedicated to him such as Comstock Bridge which stretches across the Silvermine River connecting Easton Avenue to Hoyt Street. Moreover, his name is also inscribed on the clock tower at City Hall which serves as a reminder of his dedication to Norwalk’s progress over two centuries ago.

References

Members of the Connecticut House of Representatives
Politicians from Norwalk, Connecticut